The Station Museum of Contemporary Art is a private museum owned and run by James and Ann Harithas devoted to contemporary art located in the Third Ward of Houston, Texas, United States.  Started in 2001, the museum goal is to be "a resource that deepens and broadens public awareness of the cultural, political, economic, and personal dimensions of art." The museum is an activist institution supporting civil society issues as well as artists who engage in social, political, aesthetic, economic, and/or spiritual content and expressions.

"In addition to traditional exhibitions, the museum also features monthly film-screenings, musical events, lectures, fundraisers and more which aim to inspire a dialogue that encourages the public to become actively aware of the lives of others." Past exhibitions include the art of many Texas artists, including Mel Chin, James Drake, Dick Wray, Jesse Lott, George Smith, as well as group exhibits. In addition to Texas art, the museum has shown art from Mexico, Peru, Venezuela, Colombia, Congo, South Africa, Czech Republic, Austria, Palestine, Iraq, India, Afghanistan, and Russia.

References

External links
 

Art museums and galleries in Texas
Museums in Houston
Contemporary art galleries in the United States
Modern art museums in the United States
Art museums established in 2001
2001 establishments in Texas